Steinsson may refer to:

Grétar Steinsson (born 1982), Icelandic former professional footballer
Guðmundur Steinsson (born 1960), Icelandic former professional footballer
Jón Steinsson, Chancellor's Professor of Economics at University of California, Berkeley
Unnur Steinsson (born 1963), Miss Iceland 1983

See also
Stensen
Stenson
Stensson
Stinson (disambiguation)

Icelandic-language surnames